Yat with acute (Ѣ́ ѣ́) is a letter of the Cyrillic script. It was formerly used in some East Slavic languages to represent a stressed yat. The letter comes from a yat with an acute.

Cyrillic letters with diacritics